A Walk in the Sun is a 1978 Swedish drama film directed by Hans Dahlberg and starring Gösta Ekman, Inger Lise Rypdal and Margaretha Krook. At the 15th Guldbagge Awards, Sif Ruud won the award for Best Actress. The film was based on a 1976 novel by Stig Claesson.

Premise
An unsettled Swedish sports writer tries to escape from his relationship problems and the Swedish winter by taking a package holiday to Cyprus in the Mediterranean.

Cast
 Gösta Ekman as Tore 
 Inger Lise Rypdal as Marion 
 Margaretha Krook as Ellen 
 Sif Ruud as Siv 
 Margareta Byström as Ulla 
 Irma Christenson as Vera 
 Kjerstin Dellert as Lady from Sala 
 Mihalis Giannatos as waiter 
 Kenneth Haigh as George 
 Ragnar Pelka Hansson as Swede 
 Dimitris Ioakeimidis as taxi driver 
 Kostas Kastanas as doctor 
 Nikos Kouros as optician 
 Staffan Liljander as Erik 
 Kimon Mouzenidis as hairdresser 
 Konstantina Savvidi as grape woman 
 Grigorios Siskos as police sergeant

Production 
The film was the first to be directed by Hans Dahlberg himself.

The film was shot between 13 April and 31 May 1978 in Stockholm Arlanda Airport and in the seaside resort of Loutraki, near Corinth in Greece.

The world premiere occurred at the  theatre in Stockholm on 25 December 1978, the age limit being 11.

References

External links
 
 
 

1978 films
1978 drama films
Greek drama films
Swedish drama films
1970s Swedish-language films
Films set in Cyprus
Films shot in Greece
Films shot in Stockholm
English-language Greek films
English-language Swedish films
Greek-language films
1970s Swedish films